Rabin, the Last Day is a 2015 Israeli-French docudrama political thriller film directed by Amos Gitai. It was selected to compete for the Golden Lion at the 72nd Venice International Film Festival.

Premise 
The film depicts the events surrounding the final days and assassination of Israeli Prime Minister Yitzhak Rabin.

Cast 
 Yitzhak Hiskiya as chairman
 Pini Mittelman as commission member
 Michael Warshaviak as commission member
 Einat Weizman as commission lawyer
 Yogev Yefet as Rabin's murderer
 Tomer Sisley as Rabin's driver
 Rotem Keinan as commission lawyer
 Tomer Russo as hospital director
 Uri Gottlieb as attorney general
 Ruti Asarsai as police spokeswoman
 Dalia Shimko as psychiatrist
 Gdalya Besser as police officer
 Odelia More as teacher
 Eldad Prywes as Rabin's bodyguard
 Shalom Shmuelov as intelligence officer
 Mali Levi as journalist 
 Stephen D. Root as journalist
 Liron Levo as soldier
 Yona Rosenkier as rallye driver
 Yael Abecassis as interviewer 
 Shimon Peres as himself

Reception 

Rabin, the Last Day has a score of 61% on Metacritic.
The Playlist gave the film a grade of B+, describing it as "deeply absorbing and intelligent". The Hollywood Reporter wrote that the film "benefits from fine technical work throughout, from Eric Gautier's sober cinematography to a soulful musical theme by Amit Poznansky". Jonathan Romney of Screendaily considered the film as one of Gitai's "most ambitious and compelling works yet", noting that the film's "slow, deliberate approach makes for a detached air which allows Gitai to show events with distinct clarity".

References

External links 
 

Reviews

  A. O. Scott. (January 28, 2016).Review: Amos Gitai’s ‘Rabin, the Last Day’ Looks Back in Anguish. New York Times.
  J. Hoberman (January 26, 2016). ‘Rabin, The Last Day’ makes Oliver Stone's ‘JFK’ look stone-cold sober. Tablet
 Brandon Judell (January 2, 2016). Amos Gitai: With Rabin, The Last Day , Israel’s Godard Takes on Netanyahu, Extremist Rabbis, and an Artist’s Duty. HuffPost.
 Jill Lawless (8 September 2015). Venice entry ‘Rabin, The Last Day’ probes an Israeli trauma. Times of Israel.
 Thomas L. Friedman (September 23, 2015).
 Politicians Seeing Evil, Hearing Evil, Speaking Evil. New York Times.

2015 films
2015 thriller drama films
Israeli thriller drama films
Yitzhak Rabin
Films directed by Amos Gitai
2010s political thriller films
Films about politicians
French thriller drama films
2010s Hebrew-language films
2010s English-language films
2015 drama films
2015 multilingual films
Israeli multilingual films
French multilingual films
2010s French films